X43 or X-43 may refer to:

Lancashire bus route X43, or The Witch Way, long-standing bus route in England
NASA X-43, unmanned experimental hypersonic aircraft